White Christmas is a 1996 studio album by Rosemary Clooney. This was Clooney's third Christmas album, she had previously appeared in the film, White Christmas (1954). Clooney is accompanied by a big band on the album.

Track listing
 "The Christmas Song" (Mel Tormé, Bob Wells) – 3:50
 "Let It Snow! Let It Snow! Let It Snow!" (Sammy Cahn, Jule Styne) –  3:10
 "Joy to the World" (Lowell Mason, Isaac Watts) – 0:42
 "I'll Be Home for Christmas" (Kim Gannon, Walter Kent, Buck Ram) – 3:31
 "It's the Most Wonderful Time of the Year" (Edward Pola, George Wyle)	 2:20
 "Have Yourself a Merry Little Christmas" (Ralph Blane, Hugh Martin) – 3:31
 "Christmas Love Song" (Alan Bergman, Marilyn Bergman, Johnny Mandel) – 3:29
 "The First Noël" (William B. Sandys) – 0:50
 "Winter Wonderland" (Felix Bernard, Richard B. Smith) – 2:46
 "Christmas Time Is Here" (Vince Guaraldi, Lee Mendelson) – 3:10
 "Christmas Mem'ries" (A. Bergman, M. Bergman, Don Costa) – 3:51
 "Rudolph the Red-Nosed Reindeer" (Johnny Marks) – 1:02
 "The Spirit of Christmas" (Tom Adair, Matt Dennis) – 4:32
 "Santa Claus Is Coming to Town"/"Hey Kris Kringle" (J. Fred Coots, Haven Gillespie)/(Coots, Gillespie) – 2:39
 "Count Your Blessings (Instead of Sheep)" (Irving Berlin) – 3:24
 "O Little Town of Bethlehem" (Phillips Brooks, Lewis Redner) – 0:58
 "The Christmas Waltz" (Cahn, Styne) – 2:44
 "White Christmas" (Berlin) – 3:34
 "Silent Night" (Franz Gruber, Josef Mohr) – 1:19
 "Sleep Well, Little Children" (A. Bergman, Leon Klatzkin) – 2:14
 "Don't Wait Till the Night Before Christmas" (Abel Baer, Sam M. Lewis) – 1:25

Personnel
 Rosemary Clooney – vocal

References

1996 Christmas albums
Christmas albums by American artists
Rosemary Clooney albums
Concord Records albums